Giuseppe Casale (born September 28, 1923) is an Italian historian and prelate of the Catholic Church.

Life
Casale was born in Trani, Italy and was ordained a priest on February 3, 1946. He studied theology and history, and was a professor of Church History and Italian History from 1949 to 1953 at the Catholic colleges of Trani and Molfetta. After this, he was publishing pastoral magazines. He was appointed bishop to the Roman Catholic Diocese of Vallo della Lucania on October 26, 1974 and ordained bishop December 8, 1974. He was appointed Archbishop of the Archdiocese of Foggia-Bovino on May 7, 1988 and remained in that post until his retirement on May 27, 1999.

As a bishop, he spoke often on controversial political and theological issues, and gained a reputation as left-wing and progressive. He advocated the possibility for women to become Catholic cardinals, and suggested that the Catholic Church should not oppose state legislation on same-sex marriage and consider in the future giving “a blessing from the Lord” to same-sex couples. He also served as president of CESNUR ("Center for Studies on New Religions"). In 1993, he published a pastoral letter, New Religiosity and New Evangelization, where he challenged the prevailing Catholic attitude on new religious movements, suggesting that the Catholic Church should not limit itself to criticism, but reflect on why the new movements are successful, and open a cautious dialogue with some of these groups.

See also
Diocese of Vallo della Lucania
Archdiocese of Foggia-Bovino

References

External links
Catholic-Hierarchy

1923 births
Living people
People from Trani
20th-century Italian Roman Catholic bishops
Roman Catholic archbishops in Italy
Bishops in Apulia
20th-century Italian historians